WNLC (98.7 FM) is an American radio station licensed to serve the community of East Lyme, Connecticut. The station is owned by Hall Communications, Inc., which owns a number of stations in medium-sized markets along the eastern seaboard from Vermont to Florida.  It airs a classic rock music format.

The station was assigned the WNLC call letters by the Federal Communications Commission on April 24, 1998.

References

External links
WNLC official website

NLC
Classic rock radio stations in the United States
East Lyme, Connecticut
Radio stations established in 1994
1994 establishments in Connecticut